Nagthan Assembly seat is one of 224 assembly constituencies in Karnataka State, in India. It is part of Bijapur (Lok Sabha constituency).

Assembly Members 
 2008:	Katakdhond Vitthal Dhondiba, Bharatiya Janata Party

 2013:	Raju Alagur, Indian National Congress

 2018: Devanand Fulasing Chavan, Janata Dal (Secular)

Also see
List of constituencies of the Karnataka Legislative Assembly

References

Assembly constituencies of Karnataka
Bijapur district, Karnataka